The Cross for Merit in War was a military decoration of the Duchy of Saxe-Meiningen established by Bernhard III, Duke of Saxe-Meiningen on 7 March 1915.

Criteria
The Cross for Merit in War was awarded to officers for outstanding merit displayed during World War I.  Enlisted personnel were awarded the Medal for Merit in War for similar deeds.  The cross could be awarded to combatants and non-combatants, with the ribbon differentiating between the awards.

Appearance 
Cross for Merit in War is a bronze cross pattee, the arms of the cross having curved ends.  Between the arms is a wreath of rue.  The cross is suspended from a five-arched crown. The obverse has a medallion in the center of the cross, bearing the founder's initial B.  The entire cross is surrounded by an oak wreath, tied at the cardinal points. The reverse depicts the Arms of Saxony on in the central medallion and the inscription FUR VERDIENST IM KREIGE 1914/15 on the outer edge.

The ribbon is black with yellow side stripes and green and white checkered edges for combatants.  For non-combatants the ribbon is also black and yellow, separated from a green edge by white stripes.

Notable recipients
Erich Ludendorff
Gustav von Vaerst
Philipp, Landgrave of Hesse

References

Notes

Orders, decorations, and medals of the Ernestine duchies